Tsarska Bistritsa ("Tsar's Bistritsa") is a former royal palace in southwestern Bulgaria, high in the Rila Mountains, just above the resort of Borovets and near the banks of the Bistritsa River. Built between 1898 and 1914, it served as the hunting lodge of Tsar Ferdinand of Bulgaria and his son Boris III. 

The hunting lodge was nationalized after 1945, when Bulgaria became a Communist state. The democratic changes of 1989 led to the controversial return of the palace to Simeon II, the last monarch of Bulgaria and afterwards a politician, in October 2002.

The architecture of Tsarska Bistritsa combines, in the spirit of Romanticism, elements of the authentic Bulgarian National Revival style with other European architectural styles and alpine architecture. A cabin from the transatlantic ship New America is part of the interior. It was either a gift from the captain or won by Ferdinand during a poker game. The wooden ceilings and columns in the lodge are richly decorated in a Bulgarian style. Tsarska Bistritsa also has the royal family's collection of hunting trophies filled up for more than half a century.

The palace is powered by a Siemens AG 170 kW (hydroelectric) generator built and installed in 1912. Other structures include a stable, a chapel, a garage, a sentry box and fountains.

Sitniakovo and Saragiol are also located in the Rila Mountains.

Gallery

References

Sources
Official site of H.M. King Simeon II

External links

 Pictures of Tsarska Bistritsa

Residential buildings completed in 1914
Buildings and structures in Sofia Province
Art Nouveau architecture in Bulgaria
Royal residences in Bulgaria
Palaces in Bulgaria
Art Nouveau houses
Borovets